Winchester District Memorial Hospital (WDMH) is a rural teaching hospital located in Winchester, Ontario. WDMH has a 24/7 emergency, childbirth centre and diagnostic imaging facilities including digital mammography and CT scans. It offers in-patient medical and surgical services, as well as day surgery and outpatient specialty clinics. WDMH is a hub site for cancer care, dialysis and cataract surgery. WDMH leads the Centre of Excellence for Rural Health and Education - a collaborative that brings together the hospital, local physicians, long-term care, and health and community services.

Hospital Characteristics
 23,125 emergency room visits
 557 inpatient procedures
 4,327 day surgery procedures
 646 births
 36,424 diagnostic imaging procedures
 2,528 Ontario breast screening program patient
 1,913 colonoscopies
 1,911 chemotherapy visits
 16,243 ambulatory care visits

History
 1948 - Winchester District Memorial Hospital officially opened on December 8, 1948. The two-storey building had 32 beds. In the first year, staff and physicians treated 1300 patients and delivered 245 babies.
 1955 - A new administration wing was added at a cost of $36,000. In the same year, a blood bank was established.
 1960 - The first major expansion was complete, going from 35 to 89 beds at a cost of $700,000. The new south wing included medical, surgical and maternity beds, more and larger operating rooms, x-ray and lab facilities, a new delivery suite, a cafeteria, a modern kitchen, new laundry and board rooms, a new nurses lounge and a pharmacy.
 1964 - Funds from the Harvey S. Dillabough estate made possible the construction of a $140,000 nurses' residence.
 1968 - A $1.6 million expansion included a 35-bed chronic care unit, relocation of the dietary unit, a boiler room and the addition of a 16-bed paediatric unit.
 1972 - A new modern incinerator was built at a cost of $100,000.
 1977 - $225,000 was spent to create a new x-ray room, family lounge, pharmacy and nursing office. The bed count had increased to 120 beds.
 1980 - The Extended Care Unit expanded to four beds at a cost of $105,000.
 1985 - A $600,000 project created a new lab, a renovated x-ray department and emergency and out-patient departments.
 1992 - The HELP campaign raised funds for infrastructure changes such as ventilation systems, code upgrades and plumbing.
 2009 - The new Winchester District Memorial Hospital was officially opened.

References

 Winchester District Memorial Hospital

Hospital buildings completed in 1948
Hospital buildings completed in 2009
Hospitals in Ontario